The BSWW World Ranking is a ranking system for men's national teams in beach soccer, calculated by the sport's developmental body, Beach Soccer Worldwide (BSWW). The rankings are currently led by Russia who have held the number one spot since August 2021.

The teams (both member nations of FIFA – the sport's governing body – and non-members) are ranked using a "points-per-event system", whereby the ranking of the team in the final standings of each event they participate in awards that team a certain number of points; the teams that accumulate the most points are ranked highest.

The rankings were introduced in February 2014 and are updated monthly; three teams (Russia, Portugal and Brazil) have held the top position, of which Brazil have spent the longest ranked first.

The ranking system is based upon that which is used to produce the FIFA World Rankings in its parent sport, association football, and since its establishment has been used for such purposes as seeding teams at the FIFA Beach Soccer World Cup.

Background
Since the 2000s, BSWW had been producing a European ranking; it was used to seed the teams in regional events. At each competition the teams played in, they earned points depending on their final position (an approach also adapted for use in the world ranking).

BSWW believed creating a world ranking would help teams, national associations and fans in understanding the "reality of beach soccer".

The ranking was first presented at the 2nd FIFA Beach Soccer Workshop in Dubai from 22 to 23 November 2013 to representatives of over 100 national associations who debated the composition of its materialisation.

In building the initial version of the ranking, BSWW took into account "many aspects and factors" used to create the FIFA World Rankings. Points earned from events over the previous five years (2009–13) were observed to include the outcomes of the three previous World Cups, therefore providing "an extensive results record and a solid criteria" for its basis; the results of over 1400 matches from ~100 events were integrated into the ranking. The weight of a team's points was reduced by 20% going back year on year.

The finalised version was subsequently released on 6 February 2014; for succeeding updates, the current calculation method immediately superseded the method use to create the initial ranking.

Current calculation method
As of March 2020

Points distribution
The teams are ranked using a "points-per-event system"; in each event they participate, the teams will earn ranking points (providing the event is sanctioned by BSWW and/or FIFA) – the number of points they earn is determined by their placement in the final standings of that event. The higher in the standings the team finishes, the more points they will earn. Runners-up receive 25% less points than the champions; for most subsequent places, they receive 20% less points than the position above.

BSWW have divided the different types of competitions on the calendar into eight tiers of prestige for the purposes of the world ranking. Higher tier events that are deemed to be the most prestigious reward teams with more points than lower tier events. 

The following table shows exactly how many points a team will earn per their final position at each type of event:

Points weighting & assessment periods
Only the total points earned from the above events over the last four years (counting back from the current month) go towards the team's ranking; points older than four years expire and do not count.

The four years in question are assessed as individual twelve month periods; the total points earned during each period are weighted differently to put an emphasis on the value of points earned more recently. 100% of a team's total points gained during the last twelve months count towards their ranking. However, from the three preceding twelve month periods, only a portion of their points earned during each count towards their ranking; the portion that counts gets smaller the further back in time the period in question is which are 75%, 50% and 25% of their original points totals respectively.

This is illustrated/summarised in the table below:

World number 1 teams

Ranking leaders
Timeline ofBSWW World Ranking leaders

Three teams have been ranked world number 1, namely Russia, Portugal and Brazil. The rank leaders have roughly coincided with the team that is reigning World Cup champions during that time.

When the rankings debuted in February 2014, Russia were the inaugural world leaders, having amassing over 5000 points thanks to winning the 2011 and 2013 World Cup and Euro Beach Soccer League (EBSL) titles. Portugal won the next World Cup in July 2015 and the EBSL in the August; Russia finished third in both. Despite Portugal's successes, they were not enough to knock Russia off the top spot until June 2016. Portugal relinquished their world crown to Brazil in May 2017 who immediately took the number 1 ranking and subsequently overtook Russia as the team longest ranked the world's best in October 2019. Portugal regained the world title in December 2019, cutting Brazil's lead to a mere 240 points, but nevertheless the South American's clung on to the number 1 spot in the immediate aftermath of the tournament. Brazil's near three-year stay at the top of the ranking finally ended with the release of the March 2020 listings, with world champions Portugal replacing them at the peak, becoming the first team to spend a second spell as number 1. Russia then began their second spell as ranking leaders after a five year gap, in August 2021, immediately after claiming the 2021 World Cup.

Only one team has peaked at number 2 without yet going on to reach the top spot which is Iran; Switzerland have peaked at number 3, the highest of any landlocked country.

Season-end number 1
The season-end number 1 is the team which garnered the most points during the calendar year in question.

Movers of the Month
Movers of the Month is a commendation bestowed by BSWW with the release of each new update to the rankings to give recognition to the team that during that month (providing that they have played) has moved up the rankings the most or the team which has gained the most points. It began with the September 2015 update when Power Horse became official sponsors of the rankings.

In 2020, BSWW began awarding the commendation to teams part of the club rankings and women's national teams.

The following tables list the winners of Movers of the Month:

Key:  – Men's club;  – Women's club

Other rankings
BSWW formally published a series of new rankings to accompany the primary men's national team world rankings in December 2018, all of which were concerned purely with European sides.

In November 2019, these rankings were upgraded from being only European based, to fully global rankings (save for the association ranking). Unlike the men's world ranking, they are not updated monthly. 

Each ranking category, and the basis of each (at the release of the current issue), is listed below.

Women's national teams: Ranked based on recent performances in the Women's Euro Beach Soccer Cup, World Beach Games and qualifiers.
Men's clubs: Ranked based on recent performances in the Euro Winners Cup, Copa Libertadores, Mundialito de Clubes and World Winners Cup.
Women's clubs: Ranked based on recent performances in the Women's Euro Winners Cup and World Winners Cup.
Men's national associations (Europe only): Ranked based on recent performances of the clubs representing them in the Euro Winners Cup, therefore determining which European leagues have the best quality of clubs (inspired by the UEFA country coefficient ranking).

The club rankings are used to seed teams in European competitions. Similar to the UEFA coefficient's relationship with the UEFA Champions League, the association ranking is used to determine the number of clubs that qualify from each country's domestic league to the next edition of the Euro Winners Cup; better quality associations receive more berths.

The following tables show the top ten in each ranking's current issue:

Women's national teams

Men's clubs

Women's clubs

Men's national associations

References

External links
Overall World Ranking, at Beach Soccer Worldwide
World Ranking, at Beach Soccer Russia (in Russian)

R
Sports world rankings
2014 introductions